Siva Balaji (born  as Siva Balaji Manoharan on 14 October 1981) is an Indian actor, television personality, and producer who is known for his works in the Telugu Film Industry. He was introduced as a hero by director Suresh Krissna through the film Idi Maa Ashokgadi Love Story (2003). He shot to fame with his performance as a hot blooded youth with gray shades in Arya (2004). He continued to star in films such as Sankranti (2005), Pote Poni (2006), Chandamama (2007), and Shambo Shiva Shambo (2010). Siva Balaji is known for appearing in several films as the solo lead, part of multistarrers, and in supporting roles. He won the Copper Nandi Award for his performance in the film Pothe Poni.

Siva Balaji is also a television personality. He appeared on the Telugu version of the Bigg Boss reality show that is broadcast on Star Maa, where he emerged as the title winner of season 1.

Early life and family 
Siva Balaji was born and brought up in Chennai, Tamil Nadu. He attended  Karthikeyan Matriculation Higher Secondary School. He has a younger sister Gayathri Lingam who is married to Yathendra Lingam, and younger brothers Prashanth Balaji and Krishna Sai. In 2009, he married actress Madhumitha, whom he paired in his film Englishkaran.  They have two sons, Dhanvin Kangula, born on 11 February 2010 and Gagan Kangula, born on 28 November 2014.

Career

1997–2004: Early career 

Siva Balaji started working in his father's Sri Balaji Group of companies (Sri Balaji Cylinders pvr ltd, Sri Balaji Valves Pvt ltd (DPR), and Sri Srinivasa cylinders pvr ltd (hot repair unit)) when he was 17 and established his own MSB Industries (valves, regulators and components manufacturing industry) at the age of 20. 
He got his first film offer in 2002 at the age of 22 which made him leave his entrepreneurship and choose films, as his father strictly advised him to choose, either films or business. 
He started shooting for his first film Idi Maa Ashokgadi Love Story on 23 September 2002, followed by a role in Ela Cheppanu and the lead role in Dost. 
His major break came through the film Arya (2004) directed by Sukumar. Playing the role of Ajay, local MPs spoiled brat son, who is an adamant and very possessive lover, gained him critical acclaim which made him a star in the Telugu film industry. A reviewer from Idlebrain.com quoted "Siva is good as adamant, at times confused, lover. He generated comedy in a few scenes where he shows his frustration." Reviewer from Sify.com wrote " Siva as Ajay is very promising." It was followed by Sankranti, in which he shared screen space with actors Daggubati Venkatesh and Srikanth.

2005–present 
He took up Kumkuma in 2005. He got his debut Tamil film Englishkaran in the same year. He got 5 releases in 2006, Pothe Poni, Kokila, Sarada Saradaga, Aganthakudu and Annavaram. His film Pothe Poni directed by Tammareddy Bharadwaja, won Golden Nandi Award, which got him Copper Nandi Award for the same. In 2007 two of his films- Pagale Vennela and  Chandamama were released. Chandamama directed by Krishna Vamsi, Navdeep was another lead and movie succeeded well at the box office and gained huge applause for him in the role of a good-hearted village boy. Kajal Aggarwal, and Sindhu Menon were the heroines of the film. Target released in 2008 and that's a wrong choice made. He did Mast in 2009 produced by actor Suresh. Shambo Shiva Shambo directed by Samuthirakani was another milestone in his career released in 2010 and was a huge success. He worked with Ravi Teja and Allari Naresh in the film, while Priyamani, and Abhinaya were the heroines. He took up supporting roles for Janda Pai Kapiraju and Katamarayudu, both of which helped him gain more fame post his commercial failures at the box office. He appeared in the reality show Bigg Boss Telugu, which he won on 24 September 2017. Post the success and popularity of Bigg Boss, he has returned to lead roles in films, marked by his film in 2017 Snehamera Jeevitham, and has also appeared in dance show Neethone Dance.

Filmography 
All films are in Telugu, unless otherwise noted.

Television

References 

Indian male film actors
Living people
Male actors in Telugu cinema
Male actors in Tamil cinema
1980 births
21st-century Indian male actors
Male actors from Chennai
Winner Season 1
Big Brother (franchise) winners
Telugu male actors